The 1998–99 Slovenian Basketball League, known as Liga Kolinska for sponsorship reasons, was the eighth season of the Premier A Slovenian Basketball League, the highest professional basketball league in Slovenia.

Regular season

P=Matches played, W=Matches won, L=Matches lost, F=Points for, A=Points against, Pts=Points

1ZM Lumar merged with Branik after the season.

Playoffs

External links
Official Basketball Federation of Slovenia website 

Slovenian Basketball League seasons
Slovenia
1998–99 in Slovenian basketball